Johnson Farm is a historic home and farm complex and national historic district located near Kipling, Harnett County, North Carolina. It encompasses 21 contributing buildings, 2 contributing sites, and 3 contributing structures on a rural farm complex.  The main house was built in 1918, and is a two-story, double pile, Southern Colonial frame dwelling.  It features a monumental, two-story, front-gabled portico with a one-story wraparound porch. Also on the property are two tenant houses, two country stores, and a wide variety of agricultural outbuildings.

It was listed on the National Register of Historic Places in 2010.

References

Farms on the National Register of Historic Places in North Carolina
Historic districts on the National Register of Historic Places in North Carolina
Colonial Revival architecture in North Carolina
Houses completed in 1918
Buildings and structures in Harnett County, North Carolina
National Register of Historic Places in Harnett County, North Carolina